The Phags-pa or ḥPags-pa script is an alphabet designed by the Tibetan monk and State Preceptor (later Imperial Preceptor) Drogön Chögyal Phagpa for Kublai Khan, the founder of the Yuan dynasty, as a unified script for the written languages within the Yuan. The actual use of this script was limited to about a hundred years during the Mongol-led Yuan dynasty, and it fell out of use with the advent of the Ming dynasty.

It was used to write and transcribe varieties of Chinese, the Tibetic languages, Mongolian, the Uyghur language, Sanskrit, probably Persian, and other neighboring languages during the Yuan era. For historical linguists, the documentation of its use provides clues about the changes in these languages.

Its descendant systems include Horizontal square script, used to write Tibetan and Sanskrit. There is a theory that the Korean Hangul alphabet had a limited influence from Phags-pa (see Origin of Hangul). During the Pax Mongolica the script has even made numerous appearances in western medieval art.

Nomenclature 
Phags-pa script:  , "Mongolian script";

 "new Mongolian script";

Yuan dynasty  "new Mongolian script"; ; pinyin: guózì "national script";

Modern  "Phags-pa script"; 

In English, it is also written as ḥPags-pa, Phaspa, Paspa, Baschpah, and Pa-sse-pa.

History 
During the Mongol Empire, the Mongol rulers wanted a universal script to write down the languages of the people they subjugated. The Uyghur-based Mongolian alphabet is not a perfect fit for the Middle Mongol language, and it would be impractical to extend it to a language with a very different phonology like Chinese. Therefore, during the Yuan dynasty (c. 1269), Kublai Khan asked the Tibetan monk Phags-pa to design a new alphabet for use by the whole empire. Phags-pa extended his native Tibetan alphabet to encompass Mongol and Chinese, evidently Central Plains Mandarin. The resulting 38 letters have been known by several descriptive names, such as "square script" based on their shape, but today are primarily known as the Phags-pa alphabet.

Descending from Tibetan script it is part of the Brahmic family of scripts, which includes Devanagari and scripts used throughout Southeast Asia and Central Asia. It is unique among Brahmic scripts in that it is written top bottom, like how classical Chinese used to be written; and like the Manchu alphabet or later Mongolian alphabet.

Despite its origin, the script was written vertically (top to bottom) like the previous Mongolian scripts. It did not receive wide acceptance and was not a popular script even among the elite Mongols themselves, although it was used as an official script of the Yuan dynasty until the early 1350s when the Red Turban Rebellion started. After this it was mainly used as a phonetic gloss for Mongols learning Chinese characters. It was also used as one of the scripts on Tibetan currency in the twentieth century, as script for Tibetan seal inscriptions from the Middle Ages up to the 20th century and for inscriptions on the entrance doors of Tibetan monasteries.

Syllable formation 
Although it is an alphabet, phagspa is written like a syllabary or abugida, with letters forming a single syllable glued or 'ligated' together.
Unlike the ancestral Tibetan script, all Phags-pa letters are written in temporal order (that is, /CV/ is written in the order C–V for all vowels) and in-line (that is, the vowels are not diacritics). However, vowel letters retain distinct initial forms, and short /a/ is not written except initially, making Phags-pa transitional between an abugida, a syllabary, and a full alphabet. The letters of a Phags-pa syllable are linked together so that they form syllabic blocks.

Typographic forms 
Phags-pa was written in a variety of graphic forms. The standard form (top, at right) was blocky, but a "Tibetan" form (bottom) was even more so, consisting almost entirely of straight orthogonal lines and right angles. A "seal script" form ("Mongolian Seal Script"), used for imperial seals and the like, was more elaborate, with squared sinusoidal lines and spirals. This 'Phags-pa script is different from the 'Phags-pa script, or 八思巴字 in Chinese, that shares the same name but its earliest usage can be traced back to the late 16th century, the early reign of Wanli Emperor. According to Professor Junast 照那斯图 of the Chinese Academy of Social Sciences, the later 'Phags-pa script is actually a seal script of Tibetan.

Korean records state that hangul was based on an "Old Seal Script" (古篆字), which may be Phags-pa and a reference to its Chinese name 蒙古篆字 měnggǔ zhuànzì (see origin of hangul). However, it is the simpler standard form of Phags-pa that is the closer graphic match to hangul.

Letters

Basic Letters 
The following 41 are the basic Phags-pa letters.

Letters 1-30 and 35-38 are base consonants. The order of Letters 1-30 is the same as the traditional order of the thirty basic letters of the Tibetan script, to which they correspond. Letters 35-38 represent sounds that do not occur in Tibetan, and are either derived from an existing Tibetan base consonant (e.g. Letters 2 and 35 are both derived from the simple Tibetan letter KHA, but are graphically distinct from each other) or from a combination of an existing Tibetan base consonant and the semi-vowel (subjoined) letter WA (e.g. Letter 36 is derived from the complex Tibetan letter KHWA).

As is the case with Tibetan, these letters have an inherent [a] vowel sound attached to them in non-final positions when no other vowel sign is present (e.g. the letter KA with no attached vowel represents the syllable ka, but with an appended vowel i represents the syllable ki).

Letters 31-34 and 39 are vowels. Letters 31-34 follow the traditional order of the corresponding Tibetan vowels. Letter 39 represents a vowel quality that does not occur in Tibetan, and may be derived from the Tibetan double-E vowel sign.

Unlike Tibetan, in which vowels signs may not occur in isolation but must always be attached to a base consonant to form a valid syllable, in the Phags-pa script initial vowels other than a may occur without a base consonant when they are not the first element in a diphthong (e.g. ue) or a digraph (e.g. eeu and eeo). Thus in Chinese Phags-pa texts the syllables u 吾 wú, on 刓 wán and o 訛 é occur, and in Mongolian Phags-pa texts the words ong qo chas "boats",  u su nu (gen.) "water", e du -ee "now" and i hee -een "protection" occur. These are all examples of where 'o, 'u, 'e, 'i etc. would be expected if the Tibetan model had been followed exactly. An exception to this rule is the Mongolian word 'er di nis "jewels", where a single vowel sign is attached to a null base consonant. Note that the letter EE is never found in an initial position in any language written in the Phags-pa script (for example, in Tao Zongyi's description of the Old Uighur script, he glosses all instances of Uighur e with the Phags-pa letter EE, except for when it is found in the initial position, when he glosses it with the Phags-pa letter E instead).

However, initial semi-vowels, diphthongs and digraphs must be attached to the null base consonant 'A (Letter 30). So in Chinese Phags-pa texts the syllables 'wen 元 yuán, 'ue 危 wēi and 'eeu 魚 yú occur; and in Mongolian Phags-pa texts the words 'eeu lu "not" and 'eeog bee.e "gave" occur. As there is no sign for the vowel a, which is implicit in an initial base consonant with no attached vowel sign, then words that start with an a vowel must also use the null base consonant letter 'A (e.g. Mongolian 'a mi than "living beings"). In Chinese, and rarely Mongolian, another null base consonant -A (Letter 23) may be found before initial vowels (see "Letter 23" below).

Additional Letters

Menggu Ziyun 
Following are the initials of the Phags-pa script as presented in Menggu Ziyun. They are ordered according to the Chinese philological tradition of the 36 initials.

Shilin Guangji 
The Shilin Guangji used Phagspa to annotate Chinese text, serving as a precursor to modern pinyin. The following are the Phagspa transcriptions of a section of the Hundred Family Surnames in the Shilin Guangji. For example, the name Jin (金), meaning gold, is written as or Gim, similar to how it is transliterated in Korean (Kim).

Unicode 

Phags-pa script was added to the Unicode Standard in July 2006 with the release of version 5.0.

The Unicode block for Phags-pa is U+A840–U+A877:

U+A856   is transliterated using  from the Latin Extended-D Unicode block.

See also 
 Brahmic scripts
 Mongolian alphabets
 Origin of hangul
 Mongol elements in Western medieval art
 Menggu Ziyun (Yuan dynasty Phags-pa—Chinese rhyming dictionary)
 Shilin Guangji
 Siddhaṃ script

References

Further reading

External links 

BabelStone: Phags-pa Script (with free fonts)
 Omniglot: Phags-pa script
 Ancientscripts: hPhags-pa
 Mongolian characters after Kublai Khan

Brahmic scripts
Mongolian writing systems
Transcription of Chinese
Obsolete writing systems
Abugida writing systems
Writing systems without word boundaries
Old Mandarin
Yuan dynasty
Mongolia–Tibet relations